The Kuwait women's national football team represents Kuwait in international women's association football and is governed by Kuwait Football Association (KFA).

History
The Organizing Committee of GCC Women's Sports Committee has been organizing women's football events in Kuwait in an effort to support the women's national team. 
The country's kit colors are blue shirts, white shorts, and blue socks.

As of 1999, the women's national team had not competed at the Women's World Cup.  They had never entered the Asian Women's Championship as of 1999. As of June 2017, the team was not ranked in the world by FIFA.

Background and development

In 2012 it was written that development of women's football in the Middle East and central Asia dated back only about ten years. The national federation became a FIFA affiliate in 1962.

The spread of the women's football game in Kuwait is still below the level of ambitions, despite the passage of nearly 19 years since the establishment of a national team for this game, which requires greater attention to promote this sport in line with international standards. Since its establishment in 1998 and the establishment of the Women's Football Committee in 2007, the Kuwaiti women's football team has participated in Arab and Asian competitions as part of a gesture to register sports participation in foreign forums, but that participation was contrary to the aspired hopes of that participation in terms of results and performance.
Kuwaiti women were unable to establish a professional women's sport and highlight their capabilities in football competitions compared to their achievements in shooting, swimming and show jumping competitions, due to a lack of good preparation.
In this regard, members of the Women's Football Development Committee emanating from the Kuwait Football Association and players in the Kuwaiti national team stressed today, Monday, the necessity of preparing women sports leaders in the game to build a football base and promote this game in the country.

The members called for holding football matches and competitions on a regular basis, in addition to organizing training camps with the aim of gaining experience and contact with strong teams to improve the individual and collective levels of the national team players.

The head of the Women's Football Committee of the Kuwaiti Federation, Nahed Al-Fahd, said that the game is still new and needs great efforts to develop it and raise it to regional and international levels.
Al-Fahd stressed the need to pay attention to young people in schools to discover promising players and hone their talents and skills under the supervision of a professional training and technical staff.

She explained that the development of women's football in Kuwait also requires the presence of a qualified technical staff, as well as facilities that contribute to the development of this sport.

For her part, the head of the Women's Sports Committee and a member of the Board of Directors of the Olympic Committee, Fatima Hayat, said that there are many efforts made by the committee and seeks to implement its steps on the ground with the aim of achieving the required development for this game.
Hayat added that the committee, in its efforts to develop sports, sought the help of international coach Monica Stapp, who is concerned with establishing women's sports, to develop a comprehensive plan to attract young women, in cooperation with the Public Authority for Sports.

She mentioned that the first steps to develop the game start by focusing on young female players and organizing courses to qualify national coaches and referees, which the committee will work on during the coming period.

And she indicated that the application and development of women's football can only be achieved with the cooperation and concerted efforts of the Kuwait Football Association and the Public Authority for Sports to overcome all difficulties.

For her part, Vice-President of the Women's Football Committee, Anwar Al-Nouri, said that the game needs awareness of the importance of its existence before it is developed, because it is the most popular game in the world.

Results and fixtures

The following is a list of match results in the last 12 months, as well as any future matches that have been scheduled.
Legend

2023

Coaching staff

Current coaching staff

Manager history

 Fahad Kameel (20??–2019)

Players

Current squad
The following 25 players were called up for friendly matches against xxxx on xxx. 

Caps and goals correct as of 26 February 2023

Recent call-ups
The following players have been called up to the squad in the past 12 months.

INJ Player withdrew from the squad due to an injury.
PRE Preliminary squad.
SUS Player is serving a suspension.
WD Player withdrew for personal reasons.

Previous squads

Records
Active players in bold, statistics correct as of 28 September 2022.

Most-capped players

Top goalscorers

Competitive record

FIFA Women's World Cup

*Draws include knockout matches decided on penalty kicks.

AFC Women's Asian Cup

*Draws include knockout matches decided on penalty kicks.

WAFF Women's Championship

*Draws include knockout matches decided on penalty kicks.

Head-to-head record

See also
Sport in Kuwait
Football in Kuwait
Women's football in Kuwait
Kuwait  women's national under-20 football team
Kuwait  women's national under-17 football team
Kuwaiti Women's League

References

External links
Official website
FIFA profile

َArabic women's national association football teams
Asian women's national association football teams